Dumpy Goes to the Big Smoke is a 2012 Australian short drama film written and directed by Mirrah Foulkes. The short film is produced by David Michod and Michael Cody and had its world premiere in competition at the Sydney Film Festival on 16 June 2012. After that the film compete at number of film festivals and earned good reviews.

Plot 
Dumpy a strange, cat-obsessed figure in a gold dress, who dreams of escaping to the big smoke. When a pleasant stranger appears, needing help to change a punctured tyre, opportunity final knocks.

Cast
 Emily Tomlins as Dumpy
 Anthony Hayes as Portly
 Eden Falk as Handsome Gentleman Caller

Awards

See also
 Cinema of Australia

References

External links 
 

2012 films
Australian drama short films
Australian independent films
2012 independent films
2012 short films
2010s English-language films